Kalevan Pallo (KalPa) is a professional ice hockey team which competes in the Finnish Liiga. They play in Kuopio, Finland at the Olvi Areena.

Team history
Established in 1929 as Sortavalan Palloseura in Sortavala, the club relocated to Kuopio in 1945 after its original hometown had been annexed by the Soviet Union. During its Sortavala years, the club was not active in ice hockey, but competed in association football, bandy, and pesäpallo instead. Ice hockey was introduced in 1947, and in 1956 KalPa officially replaced the more traditional Kuopio club KuPS in that sport thus specializing in hockey – minor league football was still continued until 1974 as a farm team of sorts for KuPS.

The full name of the company that runs the representative team today is KalPa Hockey Oy. The majority of the company is owned by former NHL players Sami Kapanen and Kimmo Timonen. Kapanen is the majority owner, controlling 50.5% of the franchise. Timonen owns 8%, while Timonen's former teammate Scott Hartnell owns 5%. Hartnell purchased a minority share of the team after getting financial advice from Kimmo Timonen during a road trip to Boston.

During the 2004–05 NHL lockout, Timonen, Kapanen, and fellow NHL player Adam Hall were playing for KalPa. After winning the Mestis championship, KalPa returned to SM-liiga for the 2005–06 season, after being relegated six years earlier in 1999.

KalPa has won three medals: silvers in the 1990–91 and 2016–17 seasons and a bronze in the 2008–09 season. KalPa has also won the Spengler Cup, in year 2018.

Honors

SM-liiga
  SM-liiga Kanada-malja: 1990–91, 2016-17
  SM-liiga Kanada-malja: 2008–09

Mestis
  Mestis: 2003-04, 2004–05

Finnish Liiga A-juniors (U20)
  Finnish Liiga A-juniors (U20): 2007–08, 2017–18

Spengler Cup
  2018

Players

Current roster

Honored members
1 - Pasi Kuivalainen
24 - Sami Kapanen
27 - Jouni Rinne
44 - Kimmo Timonen

NHL alumni
 Adam Hall (2004–05)
 Teemu Hartikainen (2008–10)
 Olli Jokinen (1994–95)
 Kasperi Kapanen (2012–15)
 Sami Kapanen (1990–94, 2004–05, 2008–10, 2011–14)
 Jarmo Kekäläinen (1983–85, 1991–92)
 Mikko Koskinen (2011–13)
 Artturi Lehkonen (2012–14)
 Juuso Riikola (2012–18)
 Craig Smith (2012)
 Derek Stepan (2012–13)
 Jeremy Stevenson (2007–08)
 Alexandre Texier (2017–19)
 Kimmo Timonen (1991–94, 2004–05)
 Jussi Timonen (2001–02, 2008–17)

References

External links
  
 KalPa junior official web site 
 Meltzer, Bill NHL.com article on KalPa. Retrieved 2007-11-07.

Kuopio
Liiga teams
1929 establishments in Finland
Liiga
KalPa